Bird and Roger Smith were cofounders of the Scouting movement in the Malaysian state of Negeri Sembilan in 1926, and founders in the state of Perlis in 1931.

Scouting pioneers
Year of death missing
Year of birth missing
Scouting and Guiding in Malaysia